Darreh Hamyaneh, also known as Darhamyaneh or Darreh Hambaneh, may refer to:
 Darreh Hamyaneh-ye Olya
 Darreh Hamyaneh-ye Sofla